The Late Silurian to Early Devonian Keyser Formation is a mapped limestone bedrock unit in Pennsylvania, Maryland, Virginia, and West Virginia.

Description 
The Keyser is a nodular limestone overlain by thick- and thin-bedded limestone and laminated limestone at its type locality in Keyser, West Virginia.

In central Pennsylvania, the basal "calico" limestone is a fossiliferous, medium-light- to medium-gray very thick bedded calcilutite containing numerous small irregular patches of clear calcite. The abundantly fossiliferous, nodular limestone at the base overlies the "calico". Overlying this is 5 to 6 m of fragmental calcarenite containing abundant crinoid columnals. Above the calcarenite is 6 m of fossiliferous, banded calcisiltite. The uppermost 15 m is a sequence alternating between laminated, stromatolitic calcisiltite, and calcilutite and calcisiltite that are argillaceous and fossiliferous.

Depositional environment 
The depositional environment of the Keyser is interpreted as shallow marine and tidal flats, occurring in cycles.

Stratigraphy 
Contact with Tonoloway Formation is probably conformable, but sharp enough to suggest an unconformity. Upper contact with the Old Port Formation is conformable.

The Keyser was divided into three members by J. W. Head in 1972.  These are, from lowest to highest, the Byers Island Member, Jersey Shore Member, and La Vale Member.  The type locality of the Byers Island Member is at Selinsgrove, Pennsylvania, where it is 93 feet thick.  The type locality of the Jersey Shore Member is at Jersey Shore, Lycoming County, Pennsylvania. The type locality of the La Vale Member is at the Corriganville quarry, Allegany County, Maryland, and is named for the nearby town of La Vale.  This nomenclature is accepted by the USGS.

In Virginia and West Virginia the Keyser is divided into Upper and Lower Members by the Big Mountain Shale Member.

Fossil content 

 crinoid columnals
 stromatoporoids
 Brachiopods
 Tabulate corals
 Conodonts: Icriodus woschmidti, Oulodus elegans, O. cristagalli

Notable outcrops 
 Keyser, West Virginia (type section), quarry and roadcut east of the town, on West Virginia.
 Old Eldorado Quarry, at Mile Marker 30 along I-99/U.S. Route 220 in Blair County, Pennsylvania
 Alleghany Furnace Quarry, Altoona, Pennsylvania
 St. Clairsville/Osterburg Exit of I-99 in Bedford County, Pennsylvania (nearly vertical orientation)
 Abandoned quarry in Tyrone, Pennsylvania
 Quarry at Canoe Creek, Pennsylvania
 New Enterprise New Paris Quarry, Chestnut Ridge, Bedford County, Pennsylvania
 Roadcut along U.S. Route 30 (Everett bypass) through Warrior Ridge, Bedford County, Pennsylvania
 Strait Creek section on County Road 629, 1.5 miles south of U.S. Route 220, Strait Creek, Highland County, Virginia
 Smoke Hole section on West Virginia Route 2, 1.5 miles west of U.S. Route 220, Pendleton County, West Virginia

Age 
Relative age dating places the Keyser in the late Silurian to early Devonian, with the transition occurring near the top of the formation.  Denkler and Harris used conodont biostratigraphy to confirm this.

See also 

 List of types of limestone
 Cumberland Bone Cave

References 

Geologic formations of Maryland
Geologic formations of Pennsylvania
Geologic formations of Virginia
Geologic formations of West Virginia
Devonian System of North America
Silurian System of North America
Devonian Maryland
Devonian geology of Pennsylvania
Devonian geology of Virginia
Devonian West Virginia
Silurian Maryland
Silurian geology of Pennsylvania
Silurian geology of Virginia
Silurian West Virginia
Pridoli geology
Lochkovian Stage
Limestone formations of the United States
Silurian southern paleotemperate deposits
Shallow marine deposits
Tidal deposits
Fossiliferous stratigraphic units of North America
Paleontology in Pennsylvania
Paleontology in Virginia
Paleontology in West Virginia